Greg Darnell Bunch (born May 15, 1956) is a retired American basketball player. He was a 6'6" 190 lb forward.

He played collegiately for the California State University, Fullerton.

He was selected by the New York Knicks in the 2nd round (34th pick overall) of the 1978 NBA Draft. He played for the Knicks during the 1978-79 NBA season for 12 games.

External links

1956 births
Living people
African-American basketball players
American expatriate basketball people in Spain
American men's basketball players
Basketball players from California
Bàsquet Manresa players
Cal State Fullerton Titans men's basketball players
CB L'Hospitalet players
Liga ACB players
New York Knicks draft picks
New York Knicks players
Small forwards
Sportspeople from San Bernardino, California
21st-century African-American people
20th-century African-American sportspeople